Monster: Living Off the Big Screen is a 1997 book in which John Gregory Dunne recounts his experiences as a screenwriter in Hollywood. The book focuses on the process of drafting the screenplay for Up Close & Personal (1996), a movie starring Robert Redford and Michelle Pfeiffer. It details the meetings, writing, rewriting and all the other struggles in the way of creating a sellable screenplay.  It also describes how a film that started being about Jessica Savitch ends up being a Star Is Born-type film, where one character is a "rising star," and the person she/he is in love with becomes a "falling star."

Critical reception
The Guardian called Monster "among the funniest, cruellest and most 'New York' takes on the fate of writers in the Hollywood system. Contemptuous of so much of what he saw, yet unwilling to detach himself from his own role in the process, which turned a dark, amoral tale of psychological disintegration into a feel-good vehicle for Robert Redford, Dunne 
wrote a classic."

References

Books about film
Show business memoirs
1997 non-fiction books
Random House books